Tennis was contested at the 2017 Asian Indoor and Martial Arts Games from 17 to 27 September 2017. The competition took place at the Indoor Tennis Arena in Ashgabat, Turkmenistan.

Medalists

Medal table

Results

Men's singles

Men's doubles

Women's singles

Women's doubles

Mixed doubles

References 
 Medalists by events

External links
 Official website
 Results book – Indoor Tennis

2017 Asian Indoor and Martial Arts Games events
Asian Indoor and Martial Arts Games